The 2016–17 FC Schalke 04 season was the 113th season in the club's football history. In 2015–16 the club plays in the Bundesliga, the top tier of German football. It is the club's twenty-fourth consecutive season in the Bundesliga, having been promoted from the 2. Bundesliga in 1991.

Players

Squad

Transfers

In

Out

Club

Kit
Supplier: Adidas / Sponsor: Gazprom

Friendly matches

Competitions

Overview

Bundesliga

League table

Results summary

Results by round

Matches

DFB-Pokal

UEFA Europa League

Group stage

Knockout phase

Round of 32

Round of 16

Quarter-finals

Statistics

Appearances and goals
{| class="wikitable nowrap"
|- align="center" style="background:#DCDCDC"
! colspan="25" | Squad Season 2016–17
|- align="center" style="background:#9C9C9C"
|No||NAT||Player||Age||Contract ends||||||||||||BL ||BL ||||||||Cup ||Cup ||||||||EL ||EL ||||||
|- align="center" style="background:#DCDCDC"
! colspan="25" | Goalkeepers
|- style="background:#7EC0EE"
|1||||Ralf Fährmann||||30.06.2019
||49 (0)||0||4||0||0
||34 (0)||0||3||0||0
||4 (0)||0||0||0||0
||11 (0)||0||1||0||0
|- style="background:#7EC0EE"
|30||||Timon Wellenreuther||||30.06.2017
||0 (0)||0||0||0||0
||0 (0)||0||0||0||0
||0 (0)||0||0||0||0
||0 (0)||0||0||0||0
|-
|34||||Fabian Giefer||||30.06.2018
||1 (0)||0||0||0||0
||0 (0)||0||0||0||0
||0 (0)||0||0||0||0
||1 (0)||0||0||0||0
|- style="background:#7EC0EE"
|35||||Alexander Nübel||||30.06.2018
||0 (0)||0||0||0||0
||0 (0)||0||0||0||0
||0 (0)||0||0||0||0
||0 (0)||0||0||0||0
|- align="center" style="background:#7EC0EE"
! colspan="25" | Defenders
|-
|3||||Júnior Caiçara||||30.06.2018
||7 (2)||1||2||0||0
||1 (2)||0||1||0||0
||2 (0)||0||1||0||0
||4 (0)||1||0||0||0
|- style="background:#B9FFC5"
|4||||Benedikt Höwedes (C)||||30.06.2020
||46 (0)||2||8||0||0
||31 (0)||1||7||0||0
||4 (0)||0||0||0||0
||11 (0)||1||1||0||0
|- style="background:#B9FFC5"
|6||||Sead Kolašinac||||30.06.2017
||33 (3)||3||7||0||0
||24 (1)||3||5||0||0
||3 (0)||0||0||0||0
||6 (2)||0||2||0||0
|- style="background:#B9FFC5"
|14||||Baba Rahman||||30.06.2017
||14 (7)||1||4||0||0
||7 (6)||0||2||0||0
||2 (0)||0||0||0||0
||5 (1)||1||2||0||0
|- style="background:#B9FFC5"
|15||||Dennis Aogo||||30.06.2017
||9 (5)||2||1||0||0
||3 (4)||0||1||0||0
||1 (1)||1||0||0||0
||5 (0)||1||0||0||0
|- style="background:#B9FFC5"
|20||||Thilo Kehrer||||30.06.2019
||17 (8)||1||6||0||1
||12 (4)||1||3||0||1
||0 (1)||0||0||0||0
||5 (3)||0||3||0||0
|- style="background:#B9FFC5"
|22||||Atsuto Uchida||||30.06.2018
||0 (1)||0||0||0||0
||0 (0)||0||0||0||0
||0 (0)||0||0||0||0
||0 (1)||0||0||0||0
|- style="background:#B9FFC5"
|23||||Coke||||30.06.2019
||7 (1)||1||1||0||0
||7 (1)||1||1||0||0
||0 (0)||0||0||0||0
||0 (0)||0||0||0||0
|- style="background:#B9FFC5"
|24||||Holger Badstuber||||30.06.2017
||11 (1)||0||1||1||0
||10 (0)||0||1||0||0
||1 (0)||0||0||1||0
||0 (1)||0||0||0||0
|- style="background:#B9FFC5"
|27||||Sascha Riether||||30.06.2017
||6 (3)||0||0||0||0
||3 (2)||0||0||0||0
||0 (1)||0||0||0||0
||3 (0)||0||0||0||0
|- style="background:#B9FFC5"
|28||||Joshua Bitter||||30.06.2019
||0 (0)||0||0||0||0
||0 (0)||0||0||0||0
||0 (0)||0||0||0||0
||0 (0)||0||0||0||0
|- style="background:#B9FFC5"
|29||||Naldo||||30.06.2018
||29 (0)||2||2||0||1
||19 (0)||1||1||0||1
||3 (0)||1||0||0||0
||7 (0)||0||1||0||0
|- style="background:#B9FFC5"
|31||||Matija Nastasić||||30.06.2019
||34 (1)||0||9||0||0
||21 (1)||0||6||0||0
||3 (0)||0||0||0||0
||10 (0)||0||3||0||0
|- align="center" style="background:#DCDCDC"
! colspan="25" | Midfielders
|- style="background:#FFEBAD"
|2||||Weston McKennie||||-
||0 (1)||0||0||0||0
||0 (1)||0||0||0||0
||0 (0)||0||0||0||0
||0 (0)||0||0||0||0
|- style="background:#FFEBAD"
|5||||Johannes Geis||||30.06.2019
||22 (2)||1||6||0||0
||17 (1)||0||4||0||0
||1 (0)||1||0||0||0
||4 (1)||0||2||0||0
|- style="background:#FFEBAD"
|7||||Max Meyer||||30.06.2018
||27 (11)||2||4||0||0
||18 (10)||1||4||0||0
||2 (1)||0||0||0||0
||7 (2)||1||0||0||0
|- style="background:#FFEBAD"
|8||||Leon Goretzka||||30.06.2018
||39 (2)||8||4||0||0
||30 (0)||5||2||0||0
||2 (0)||0||0||0||0
||7 (2)||3||2||0||0
|- style="background:#FFEBAD"
|10||||Nabil Bentaleb||||30.06.2017
||38 (6)||7||12||0||0
||28 (4)||5||11||0||0
||3 (0)||0||1||0||0
||7 (2)||2||0||0||0
|- style="background:#FFEBAD"
|11||||Yevhen Konoplyanka||||30.06.2017
||10 (17)||6||2||0||0
||5 (12)||1||1||0||0
||1 (1)||3||1||0||0
||4 (4)||2||0||0||0
|- style="background:#FFEBAD"
|17||||Benjamin Stambouli||||30.06.2020
||26 (11)||0||6||0||1
||15 (8)||0||3||0||1
||3 (0)||0||1||0||0
||8 (3)||0||2||0||0
|- style="background:#FFEBAD"
|18/2||||Daniel Caligiuri||||30.06.2020
||20 (3)||4||1||0||0
||14 (2)||2||0||0||0
||1 (1)||1||0||0||0
||5 (0)||1||1||0||0
|-
|18||||Sidney Sam||||30.06.2018
||0 (1)||0||0||0||0
||0 (0)||0||0||0||0
||0 (0)||0||0||0||0
||0 (1)||0||0||0||0
|- style="background:#FFEBAD"
|21||||Alessandro Schöpf||||30.06.2019
||30 (12)||8||6||0||0
||22 (6)||6||4||0||0
||3 (2)||1||1||0||0
||6 (4)||1||1||0||0
|- align="center" style="background:#DCDCDC"
! colspan="25" | Forwards
|- style="background:#FFCBCB"
|9||||Franco Di Santo||||30.06.2019
||5 (10)||0||3||0||0
||3 (9)||0||2||0||0
||1 (0)||0||0||0||0
||1 (1)||0||1||0||0
|- style="background:#FFCBCB"
|13||||Eric M. Choupo-Moting||||30.06.2017
||23 (7)||3||2||0||0
||19 (4)||3||1||0||0
||0 (2)||0||0||0||0
||4 (1)||0||1||0||0
|-
|16||||Fabian Reese||||30.06.2019
||2 (4)||0||0||0||0
||1 (2)||0||0||0||0
||0 (1)||0||0||0||0
||1 (1)||0||0||0||0
|- style="background:#FFCBCB"
|19||||Guido Burgstaller||||30.06.2020
||24 (1)||12||2||0||0
||17 (1)||9||1||0||0
||2 (0)||0||0||0||0
||5 (0)||3||1||0||0
|- style="background:#FFCBCB"
|25||||Klaas-Jan Huntelaar||||30.06.2017
||10 (14)||5||2||0||0
||7 (9)||2||1||0||0
||2 (1)||2||0||0||0
||1 (4)||1||1||0||0
|- style="background:#FFCBCB"
|32||||Bernard Tekpetey||||30.06.2018
||1 (2)||0||1||1||0
||0 (2)||0||1||0||0
||0 (0)||0||0||0||0
||1 (0)||0||0||1||0
|- style="background:#FFCBCB"
|33||||Donis Avdijaj||||30.06.2019
||3 (9)||2||1||0||0
||2 (6)||2||1||0||0
||0 (0)||0||0||0||0
||1 (3)||0||0||0||0
|- style="background:#FFCBCB"
|36||||Breel Embolo||||30.06.2021
||7 (3)||3||0||0||0
||4 (3)||2||0||0||0
||1 (0)||1||0||0||0
||2 (0)||0||0||0||0
|- style="background:#FFCBCB"
|—||||Felix Schröter||||30.06.2018
||0 (0)||0||0||0||0
||0 (0)||0||0||0||0
||0 (0)||0||0||0||0
||0 (0)||0||0||0||0
|- align="left" style="background:#DCDCDC"
| colspan="5" | Total ||—||74||97||2||3||—||45||67||0||3||—||11||5||1||0||—||18||25||1||0
|- align="left" style="background:#DCDCDC"
! colspan="25" |Last updated: 17 May 2017
|}Players in white left the club during the season.''

References

FC Schalke 04 seasons
Schalke
Schalke